Paal may refer to:
 Paal, Belgium, a town in Limburg
 Paal, Netherlands, a village in Zeeland
 Phall, a very hot curry dish
 Paal Kibsgaard (born 1967), Norwegian petroleum engineer and businessman, chairman and CEO of Schlumberger
 György Paál, Hungarian astronomer
 Heinrich Paal, Estonian footballer